The Horror at 37,000 Feet is a 1973 American supernatural horror television film directed by David Lowell Rich. The film stars Chuck Connors, Buddy Ebsen, Tammy Grimes, William Shatner, and Paul Winfield. It centers on hapless passengers and crew members plagued by demonic forces from within the baggage hold.

Plot

On a Boeing 747 flight from London to New York piloted by Captain Ernie Slade (Chuck Connors), a wealthy architect (Roy Thinnes) and his wife (Jane Merrow) have placed a druidic sacrificial altar in the baggage hold of the airliner. Aboard for the ill-fated trip is ex-priest Paul Kovalik (William Shatner) and millionaire Glenn Farlee (Buddy Ebsen). Soon after takeoff, crew and passengers alike face the supernatural horror that is unleashed from the baggage compartment — the ghosts of the druids, seeking revenge for being uprooted from their ancient home. After the demonic ghosts force the plane back towards London with gale-force winds, they begin freezing the plane's interior. The spirits then torment the passengers with horrific visions and feats of telekinesis. The passengers try to trick the ghosts by sacrificing a doll to them, but it only further angers the spirits. After a few of the passengers and crew are killed, Kovalik moves to the rear of the plane to try and determine what the spirits want. It turns out, they wish to be returned to their ancestral burial grounds, and they require a human sacrifice. An emergency door is then blown open and Kovalik is sucked out of the plane to his death, satisfying the ghosts. They then allow the 747 to land safely.

Cast
 Chuck Connors as Captain Ernie Slade
 Buddy Ebsen as Glenn Farlee
 Tammy Grimes as Mrs. Pinder
 Lynn Loring as Manya
 Jane Merrow as Sheila O'Neill
 France Nuyen as Annalik
 William Shatner as Paul Kovalik
 Roy Thinnes as Alan O'Neill
 Paul Winfield as Dr. Enkalla
 Will Hutchins as Steve Holcomb
 Darleen Carr as Margot
 Brenda Benet as Sally
 Russell Johnson as Jim Hawley
 H. M. Wynant as Frank Driscoll
 Mia Bendixsen as Jodi
 Gerald Peters as Tractor Loader
 Robert Donner as Dispatcher
 Peter Ashton as Clerk
 Veronica Anderson as 2nd Clerk

Production

The Horror at 37,000 Feet was entirely shot on sound stages at the CBS Studio Center, Studio City, Los Angeles, California.

Reception

In a later review, critic Richard Scheib commented: "The Horror at 37,000 Feet is a silly film, although to its credit it and most of the principals do maintain a degree of intent gravity and at least treat the exercise seriously."

Shatner described his character's demise in the movie as one of his "unique ways" of dying: "I get sucked out of an airplane while carrying a lit torch into the airliner's baggage compartment to try to confront a druid ghost."  According to Shatner, many of his fans consider the movie the worst film in which he has ever appeared.

The movie debuted on CBS on February 13, 1973 as the "CBS Tuesday Movie" and was the sixth-most watched primetime show of the week, with a 25.9 rating.

References
Notes

Bibliography

 Roberts, Jerry. Encyclopedia of Television Film Directors. Lanham, Maryland: Scarecrow Press, 2009. .
 Shatner, William and David Fisher. Up Till Now: The Autobiography. New York: MacMillan, 2009. .
 Young, R.G. The Encyclopedia of Fantastic Film: Ali Baba to Zombies. Winona, Minnesota: Hal Leonard Corporation, 2000. .

External links
 
 

1973 films
1973 horror films
1973 television films
1970s ghost films
1970s supernatural horror films
American aviation films
American ghost films
American supernatural horror films
American horror television films
CBS network films
Demons in film
Films about aviation accidents or incidents
Films directed by David Lowell Rich
Films set on airplanes
Films shot in Los Angeles
1970s English-language films
1970s American films